King Buzzo is an EP by Melvins' guitarist Buzz Osborne, which was released in 1992 through Boner Records. Osborne recruited Nirvana drummer Dave Grohl for the project. Grohl is credited as "Dale Nixon", in reference to the pseudonym Greg Ginn adopted for playing bass on Black Flag's My War.

Osborne does not appear on "Skeeter" as it is a remix of the song "Just Another Story About Skeeter Thompson" that Grohl recorded for his Pocketwatch solo album. Skeeter Thompson was the bassist of Grohl's old band Scream.

The cover art for the album is a parody of the cover art from Gene Simmons' 1978 solo release.

Buzz Osborne has stated, according to a CMJ New Music article in 2005:

Track listing
All songs written by Buzz Osborne and Dale Nixon.

Personnel
King Buzzo – lead vocals, guitar, bass, producer (all tracks 1–3)
Dale Nixon – drums (1-4); lead vocals, guitar, bass, producer (all track 4)
Barrett Jones – producer, engineer
Harvey Bennett Stafford – cover and insert painting

References

1992 EPs
Melvins EPs
Boner Records albums